

Events

Pre-1600
 771 – Austrasian king Carloman I dies, leaving his brother Charlemagne as sole king of the Frankish Kingdom.
 963 – The lay papal protonotary is elected pope and takes the name Leo VIII, being consecrated on 6 December after ordination.
1110 – An army led by Baldwin I of Jerusalem and Sigurd the Crusader of Norway captures Sidon at the end of the First Crusade.
1259 – Kings Louis IX of France and Henry III of England agree to the Treaty of Paris, in which Henry renounces his claims to French-controlled territory on continental Europe (including Normandy) in exchange for Louis withdrawing his support for English rebels.
1563 – The final session of the Council of Trent is held nearly 18 years after the body held its first session on December 13, 1545.

1601–1900
1619 – Thirty-eight colonists arrive at Berkeley Hundred, Virginia. The group's charter proclaims that the day "be yearly and perpetually kept holy as a day of thanksgiving to Almighty God."
1676 – The Royal Danish Army under the command of King Christian V engages the Swedish Army commanded by the Swedish king Charles XI at the Battle of Lund, to this day it is counted as the bloodiest battle in Scandinavian history and a turning point in the Scanian War.
1745 – Charles Edward Stuart's army reaches Derby, its furthest point during the Second Jacobite Rising.
1783 – At Fraunces Tavern in New York City, U.S. General George Washington bids farewell to his officers.
1786 – Mission Santa Barbara is dedicated (on the feast day of Saint Barbara).
1791 – The first edition of The Observer, the world's first Sunday newspaper, is published.
1804 – The United States House of Representatives adopts articles of impeachment against Supreme Court Justice Samuel Chase.
1829 – In the face of fierce local opposition, British Governor-General Lord William Bentinck issues a regulation declaring that anyone who abets suttee in Bengal is guilty of culpable homicide.
1861 – The 109 Electors of the several states of the Confederate States of America unanimously elect Jefferson Davis as President and Alexander H. Stephens as Vice President.
1864 – American Civil War: Sherman's March to the Sea: At Waynesboro, Georgia, forces under Union General Judson Kilpatrick prevent troops led by Confederate General Joseph Wheeler from interfering with Union General William T. Sherman's campaign destroying a wide swath of the South on his march to the Atlantic Ocean from Atlanta.
1865 – North Carolina ratifies 13th Amendment to the U.S. Constitution, followed soon by Georgia, and U.S. slaves were legally free within two weeks.
1867 – Former Minnesota farmer Oliver Hudson Kelley founds the Order of the Patrons of Husbandry (better known today as the Grange).
1872 – The crewless American brigantine , drifting in the Atlantic, is discovered by the Canadian brig Dei Gratia. The ship has been abandoned for nine days but is only slightly damaged. Her master Benjamin Briggs and all nine others known to have been on board are never accounted for.
1875 – Notorious New York City politician Boss Tweed escapes from prison; he is later recaptured in Spain.
1881 – The first edition of the Los Angeles Times is published.
1893 – First Matabele War: A patrol of 34 British South Africa Company soldiers is ambushed and annihilated by more than 3,000 Matabele warriors on the Shangani River in Matabeleland.

1901–present
1906 – Alpha Phi Alpha the first intercollegiate Greek lettered fraternity for African-Americans was founded at Cornell University in Ithaca, New York.
1909 – In Canadian football, the First Grey Cup game is played. The University of Toronto Varsity Blues defeat the Toronto Parkdale Canoe Club, 26–6.
  1909   – The Montreal Canadiens ice hockey club, the oldest surviving professional hockey franchise in the world, is founded as a charter member of the National Hockey Association.
1917 – After drafting the Declaration of Independence, the Finnish Senate headed by P. E. Svinhufvud submitted to the Parliament of Finland a proposal for the form of government of the Republic of Finland and issued a communication to Parliament declaring independence of Finland.
1918 – U.S. President Woodrow Wilson sails for the World War I peace talks in Versailles, becoming the first US president to travel to Europe while in office.
1919 – Ukrainian War of Independence: The Polonsky conspiracy is initiated, with an attempt to assassinate the high command of the Revolutionary Insurgent Army of Ukraine.
1928 – Cosmo Gordon Lang was enthroned as the Archbishop of Canterbury, the first bachelor to be appointed in 150 years. 
1939 – World War II:  is struck by a mine (laid by ) off the Scottish coast and is laid up for repairs until August 1940.
1942 – World War II: Carlson's patrol during the Guadalcanal Campaign ends.
1943 – World War II: In Yugoslavia, resistance leader Marshal Josip Broz Tito proclaims a provisional democratic Yugoslav government in-exile.
  1943   – World War II: U.S. President Franklin D. Roosevelt closes down the Works Progress Administration, because of the high levels of wartime employment in the United States.
1945 – By a vote of 65–7, the United States Senate approves United States participation in the United Nations. (The UN had been established on October 24, 1945.)
1948 – Chinese Civil War: The SS Kiangya, carrying Nationalist refugees from Shanghai, explodes in the Huangpu River.
1949 – Sir Duncan George Stewart was fatally stabbed by Rosli Dhobi, a member leader of the Rukun 13, in Sibu, Sarawak, Malaysia during the British crown colony era in that state.
1950 – Korean War: Jesse L. Brown (the 1st African-American Naval aviator) is killed in action during the Battle of Chosin Reservoir.
1956 – The Million Dollar Quartet (Elvis Presley, Jerry Lee Lewis, Carl Perkins, and Johnny Cash) get together at Sun Studio for the first and last time.
1964 – Free Speech Movement: Police arrest over 800 students at the University of California, Berkeley, following their takeover and sit-in at the administration building in protest of the UC Regents' decision to forbid protests on UC property.
1965 – Launch of Gemini 7 with crew members Frank Borman and Jim Lovell. The Gemini 7 spacecraft was the passive target for the first crewed space rendezvous performed by the crew of Gemini 6A.
1967 – Vietnam War: U.S. and South Vietnamese forces engage Viet Cong troops in the Mekong Delta.
1969 – Black Panther Party members Fred Hampton and Mark Clark are shot and killed during a raid by 14 Chicago police officers.
1971 – Indo-Pakistani War of 1971: The Indian Navy attacks the Pakistan Navy and Karachi.
  1971   – The PNS Ghazi, a Pakistan Navy submarine, sinks during the course of the Indo-Pakistani Naval War of 1971.
  1971   – During a concert by Frank Zappa and The Mothers of Invention at the Montreux Casino, an audience member fires a flare gun into the ceiling, causing a fire that destroys the venue. Rock band Deep Purple, who were there to use the Casino to record their next album, witnesses the fire from their hotel; the incident would be immortalized in their best known song, "Smoke on the Water".
1974 – Martinair Flight 138 crashes into the Saptha Kanya mountain range in Maskeliya, Sri Lanka, killing 191.
1977 – Jean-Bédel Bokassa, president of the Central African Republic, crowns himself Emperor Bokassa I of the Central African Empire.
  1977   – Malaysian Airline System Flight 653 is hijacked and crashes in Tanjong Kupang, Johor, killing 100.
1978 – Following the murder of Mayor George Moscone, Dianne Feinstein becomes San Francisco's first female mayor.
1979 – The Hastie fire in Hull kills three schoolboys and eventually leads police to arrest Bruce George Peter Lee.
1981 – South Africa grants independence to the Ciskei "homeland" (not recognized by any government outside South Africa).
1982 – The People's Republic of China adopts its current constitution.
1983 – US Navy aircraft from USS John F. Kennedy and USS Independence attack Syrian missile sites in Lebanon in response to an F-14 being fired on by an SA-7. One A-6 Intruder and A-7 Corsair are shot down. One American pilot is killed, one is rescued, and one is captured.
1984 – Sri Lankan Civil War: Sri Lankan Army soldiers kill 107–150 civilians in Mannar.
1991 – Terry A. Anderson is released after seven years in captivity as a hostage in Beirut; he is the last and longest-held American hostage in Lebanon.
  1991   – Pan American World Airways ceases its operations after 64 years.
1992 – Somali Civil War: President George H. W. Bush orders 28,000 U.S. troops to Somalia in Northeast Africa.
1998 – The Unity Module, the second module of the International Space Station, is launched.
2005 – Tens of thousands of people in Hong Kong protest for democracy and call on the government to allow universal and equal suffrage.
2006 – Six black youths assault a white teenager in Jena, Louisiana.
2014 – Islamic insurgents kill three state police at a traffic circle before taking an empty school and a "press house" in Grozny. Ten state forces die with 28 injured in gun battles ending with ten insurgents killed.
2015 – A firebomb is thrown into a restaurant in the Egyptian capital of Cairo, killing 17 people.
2017 – The Thomas Fire starts near Santa Paula in California. It eventually became the largest wildfire in modern California history to date after burning  in Ventura and Santa Barbara Counties.
2021 – Semeru on the Indonesian island of Java erupts, killing at least 68 people.

Births

Pre-1600
AD 34 – Persius, Roman poet (d. 62)
 846 – Hasan al-Askari 11th Imam of Twelver Shia Islam (d. 874)
1428 – Bernard VII, Lord of Lippe (d. 1511)
1506 – Thomas Darcy, 1st Baron Darcy of Chiche (d. 1558)
1555 – Heinrich Meibom, German poet and historian (d. 1625)
1575 – Sister Virginia Maria, Italian nun (d. 1650)
1580 – Samuel Argall, English adventurer and naval officer (d. 1626)
1585 – John Cotton, English-American minister and theologian (d. 1652)
1595 – Jean Chapelain, French poet and critic (d. 1674)

1601–1900
1647 – Daniel Eberlin, German composer (d. 1715)
1660 – André Campra, French composer and conductor (d. 1744)
1667 – Michel Pignolet de Montéclair, French composer and educator (d. 1737)
1670 – John Aislabie, English politician, Chancellor of the Exchequer (d. 1742)
1713 – Gasparo Gozzi, Italian playwright and critic (d. 1786)
1777 – Juliette Récamier, French businesswoman (d. 1849)
1795 – Thomas Carlyle, Scottish-English historian, philosopher, and academic (d. 1881)
1798 – Jules Armand Dufaure, French lawyer and politician, 33rd Prime Minister of France (d. 1881)
1817 – Nikoloz Baratashvili, Georgian poet and author (d. 1845)
1835 – Samuel Butler, English author and critic (d. 1902)
1844 – Franz Xavier Wernz, German religious leader, 25th Superior General of the Society of Jesus (d. 1914)
1861 – Hannes Hafstein, Icelandic poet and politician, 1st Prime Minister of Iceland (d. 1922)
1865 – Edith Cavell, English nurse, humanitarian, and saint (Anglicanism) (d. 1915)
1867 – Stanley Argyle, Australian politician, 32nd Premier of Victoria (d. 1940)
1868 – Jesse Burkett, American baseball player, coach, and manager (d. 1953)
1875 – Agnes Forbes Blackadder, Scottish medical doctor (d. 1964)
  1875   – Joe Corbett, American baseball player and coach (d. 1945)
  1875   – Rainer Maria Rilke, Austrian-Swiss poet and author (d. 1926)
1881 – Erwin von Witzleben, Polish-German field marshal (d. 1944)
1882 – Constance Davey, Australian psychologist (d. 1963)
1883 – Katharine Susannah Prichard, Australian author and playwright (d. 1969)
1884 – R. C. Majumdar, Indian historian (d. 1980)
1887 – Winifred Carney, Irish suffragist, trade unionist, and Irish republican (d. 1943)
1892 – Francisco Franco, Spanish general and dictator, Prime Minister of Spain (d. 1975)
  1892   – Liu Bocheng, Chinese commander and politician (d. 1986)
1893 – Herbert Read, English poet and critic (d. 1968)
1895 – Feng Youlan, Chinese philosopher and academic (d. 1990)
1897 – Robert Redfield, American anthropologist of Mexico (d. 1958)
1899 – Karl-Günther Heimsoth, German physician and politician (d. 1934)
  1899   – Charlie Spencer, English footballer and manager (d. 1953)

1901–present
1903 – Cornell Woolrich, American author (d. 1968)
1904 – Albert Norden, German journalist and politician (d. 1982)
1908 – Alfred Hershey, American bacteriologist and geneticist, Nobel Prize laureate (d. 1997)
1910 – Alex North, American composer and conductor (d. 1991)
  1910   – R. Venkataraman, Indian lawyer and politician, 6th President of India (d. 2009)
1912 – Pappy Boyington, American colonel and pilot, Medal of Honor recipient (d. 1988)
1913 – Mark Robson, Canadian-American director and producer (d. 1978)
1914 – Rudolf Hausner, Austrian painter and sculptor (d. 1995)
  1914   – Claude Renoir, French cinematographer (d. 1993)
1915 – Eddie Heywood, American pianist and composer (d. 1989)
1916 – Ely Jacques Kahn, Jr., American journalist and author (d. 1994)
1919 – I. K. Gujral, Indian poet and politician, 12th Prime Minister of India (d. 2012)
1920 – Nadir Afonso, Portuguese painter and architect (d. 2013)
  1920   – Michael Bates, English actor (d. 1978)
  1920   – Jeanne Manford, American educator and activist, co-founded PFLAG (d. 2013)
1921 – Deanna Durbin, Canadian actress and singer (d. 2013)
1923 – Charles Keating, American lawyer and financier (d. 2014)
  1923   – Eagle Keys, American-Canadian football player and coach (d. 2012)
  1923   – John Krish, English director and screenwriter (d. 2016)
1924 – John C. Portman, Jr., American architect, designed the Renaissance Center and Tomorrow Square (d. 2017)
1925 – Albert Bandura, Canadian-American psychologist and academic (d. 2021)
1926 – Ned Romero, American actor and opera singer (d. 2017)
1929 – Şakir Eczacıbaşı, Turkish pharmacist, photographer, and businessman (d. 2010)
1930 – Ronnie Corbett, Scottish actor and screenwriter (d. 2016)
  1930   – Jim Hall, American guitarist and composer (d. 2013)
1931 – Alex Delvecchio, Canadian ice hockey player, coach, and manager
  1931   – Wally George, American radio and television host (d. 2003)
1932 – Roh Tae-woo, South Korean general and politician, 6th President of South Korea (d. 2021)
1933 – Wink Martindale, American game show host and producer
  1933   – Horst Buchholz, German actor (d. 2003)
1934 – Bill Collins, Australian film critic and author (d. 2019)
  1934   – Victor French, American actor and director (d. 1989)
1935 – Paul O'Neill, American businessman and politician, 72nd United States Secretary of the Treasury (d. 2020)
1936 – John Giorno, American poet and performance artist (d. 2019)
1937 – Max Baer, Jr., American actor, director, and producer
1938 – Andre Marrou, American lawyer and politician
  1938   – Yvonne Minton, Australian-English soprano and actress
1939 – Stephen W. Bosworth, American academic and diplomat, United States Ambassador to South Korea (d. 2016)
  1939   – Joan Brady, American-British author
  1939   – Freddy Cannon, American singer and guitarist
1940 – Gerd Achterberg, German footballer and manager
  1940   – Gary Gilmore, American murderer (d. 1977)
1941 – Marty Riessen, American tennis player and coach
1942 – Bob Mosley, American singer-songwriter and bass player
1944 – Chris Hillman, American singer-songwriter and guitarist 
  1944   – Anna McGarrigle, Canadian musician and singer-songwriter 
  1944   – François Migault, French race car driver (d. 2012)
  1944   – Dennis Wilson, American singer-songwriter, producer, and drummer (d. 1983)
1945 – Roberta Bondar, Canadian neurologist, academic, and astronaut
1946 – Karina, Spanish singer/actress
1947 – Jane Lubchenco, American ecologist, academic, and diplomat
1948 – Southside Johnny, American singer-songwriter 
1949 – Jeff Bridges, American actor
  1949   – Jock Stirrup, Baron Stirrup, English air marshal and politician
1950 – Bjørn Kjellemyr, Norwegian bassist and composer
1951 – Gary Rossington, American guitarist (d. 2023) 
  1951   – Patricia Wettig, American actress and playwright
1953 – Rick Middleton, Canadian ice hockey player and sportscaster
  1953   – Jean-Marie Pfaff, Belgian footballer and manager 
1955 – Philip Hammond, English businessman and politician, former Chancellor of the Exchequer
  1955   – Dave Taylor, Canadian-American ice hockey player and manager
  1955   – Cassandra Wilson, American singer-songwriter and producer 
1956 – Nia Griffith, Welsh educator and politician, former Shadow Secretary of State for Wales
  1956   – Bernard King, American basketball player and sportscaster
1957 – Raul Boesel, Brazilian race car driver and radio host
  1957   – Eric S. Raymond, American computer programmer and author
  1957   – Lee Smith, American baseball player
1960 – David Green, Nicaraguan-American baseball player
  1960   – Glynis Nunn, Australian heptathlete and hurler
1961 – Frank Reich, American football player and coach
1962 – Vinnie Dombroski, American singer-songwriter and musician
  1962   – Gary Freeman, New Zealand rugby league player, coach, and sportscaster
  1962   – Nixon Kiprotich, Kenyan runner
  1962   – Kevin Richardson, English footballer and manager
1963 – Sergey Bubka, Ukrainian pole vaulter
  1963   – Nigel Heslop, English rugby player
1964 – Scott Hastings, Scottish rugby player and sportscaster
  1964   – Marisa Tomei, American actress
1965 – Álex de la Iglesia, Spanish director, producer, and screenwriter
  1965   – Shaun Hollamby, English race car driver and businessman
  1965   – Ulf Kirsten, German footballer and manager
1966 – Fred Armisen, American actor and musician 
  1966   – Andy Hess, American bass player 
  1966   – Suzanne Malveaux, American journalist
  1966   – Suzette M. Malveaux, American lawyer and academic
1967 – Guillermo Amor, Spanish footballer and manager
1968 – Tahir Dawar, Pakistani police officer and Pashto poet (d. 2018)
1969 – Dionne Farris, American singer-songwriter, producer and actress 
  1969   – Jay-Z, American rapper, producer, and actor, co-founded Roc-A-Fella Records
  1969   – Plum Sykes, English journalist and author
1971 – Shannon Briggs, American boxer and actor
1972 – Jassen Cullimore, Canadian ice hockey player
  1972   – Yūko Miyamura, Japanese voice actress and singer
1973 – Tyra Banks, American model, actress, and producer
  1973   – Frank Boeijen, Dutch keyboard player 	
  1973   – Mina Caputo, American singer-songwriter and keyboard player 
  1973   – Michael Jackson, English footballer and manager	
  1973   – Steven Menzies, Australian rugby league player
  1973   – Kate Rusby, English singer-songwriter and guitarist 
1974 – Tadahito Iguchi, Japanese baseball player
1976 – Kristina Groves, Canadian speed skater
1977 – Ajit Agarkar, Indian cricketer
  1977   – Darvis Patton, American sprinter
  1977   – Morten Veland, Norwegian guitarist and songwriter
1978 – Jaclyn Victor, Malaysian singer and actress
1979 – Ysabella Brave, American singer-songwriter
  1979   – Jay DeMerit, American soccer player
1980 – Rick Victor, Canadian wrestler and manager
1981 – Brian Vandborg, Danish cyclist
1982 – Nathan Douglas, English triple jumper
  1982   – Waldo Ponce, Chilean footballer
  1982   – Ho-Pin Tung, Dutch-Chinese race car driver
  1982   – Nick Vujicic, Australian evangelist
1983 – Jimmy Bartel, Australian footballer
  1983   – Chinx, American rapper (d. 2015)
1984 – Marco Giambruno, Italian footballer
  1984   – Anna Petrakova, Russian basketball player
  1984   – Joe Thomas, American football player
1985 – Andrew Brackman, American baseball player
  1985   – Stephen Dawson, Irish footballer 
  1985   – Carlos Gómez, Dominican baseball player
1986 – Kaija Udras, Estonian skier
  1986   – Martell Webster, American basketball player
1987 – Orlando Brown, American actor and rapper
1988 – Andriy Pylyavskyi, Ukrainian footballer
  1988   – Yeng Constantino, Filipina singer and songwriter
1990 – Lukman Haruna, Nigerian footballer
  1990   – Blake Leary, Australian rugby league player
  1990   – Igor Sjunin, Estonian triple jumper
1991 – Reality Winner, American intelligence specialist convicted of espionage
1992 – Peta Hiku, New Zealand rugby league player
  1992   – Jean-Claude Iranzi, Rwandan footballer
  1992   – Kim Seok-Jin, South Korean singer, songwriter and actor
1996 – Diogo Jota, Portuguese professional footballer
  1996   – Sebastián Vegas, Chilean footballer
  1996   – Ivan Belikov, Russian footballer
1999 – Kim Do-yeon, South Korean singer and actress

Deaths

Pre-1600
530 BC – Cyrus the Great, king of Persia (b. 600 BC)
 749 – John of Damascus, Syrian priest and saint (b. 676)
 771 – Carloman I, Frankish king (b. 751)
 870 – Suairlech ind Eidnén mac Ciaráin, Irish bishop
1075 – Anno II, German archbishop and saint (b. 1010)
1131 – Omar Khayyám, Persian poet, astronomer, mathematician, and philosopher (b. 1048)
1214 – William the Lion, Scottish king (b. 1143)
1260 – Aymer de Valence, Bishop of Winchester (b. 1222)
1270 – Theobald II of Navarre (b. 1238)
1334 – Pope John XXII (b. 1249)
1340 – Henry Burghersh, English bishop and politician, Lord Chancellor of England (b. 1292)
1341 – Janisław I, Archbishop of Gniezno
1408 – Valentina Visconti, wife of Louis of Valois, Duke of Orléans
1456 – Charles I, Duke of Bourbon (b. 1401)
1459 – Adolphus VIII, Count of Holstein (b. 1401)
1576 – Georg Joachim Rheticus, Austrian-Slovak mathematician and cartographer (b. 1514)
1585 – John Willock, Scottish minister and reformer (b. 1515)

1601–1900
1603 – Maerten de Vos, Flemish painter and draughtsman (b. 1532)
1609 – Alexander Hume, Scottish poet (b. 1560)
1637 – Nicholas Ferrar, English trader (b. 1592)
1642 – Cardinal Richelieu, French cardinal and politician, Chief Minister to the French Monarch (b. 1585)
1649 – William Drummond of Hawthornden, Scottish poet (b. 1585)
1679 – Thomas Hobbes, English philosopher and theorist (b. 1588)
1680 – Thomas Bartholin, Danish physician, mathematician, and theologian (b. 1616)
1696 – Empress Meishō of Japan (b. 1624)
1732 – John Gay, English poet and playwright (b. 1685)
1798 – Luigi Galvani, Italian physician, physicist, and philosopher (b. 1737)
1828 – Robert Jenkinson, 2nd Earl of Liverpool, English politician, Prime Minister of the United Kingdom (b. 1770)
1839 – John Leamy, Irish–American merchant (b. 1757)
1841 – David Daniel Davis, Welsh-English physician and academic (b. 1777)
1845 – Gregor MacGregor, Scottish soldier and explorer (b. 1786)
1850 – William Sturgeon, English physicist, invented the electric motor (b. 1783)
1893 – John Tyndall, Irish-English physicist and chemist (b. 1820)
1897 – Griffith Rhys Jones, Welsh conductor (b. 1834)

1901–present
1902 – Charles Dow, American journalist and publisher, co-founded the Dow Jones & Company (b. 1851)
1926 – Ivana Kobilca, Slovenian painter (b. 1861)
1933 – Stefan George, German-Swiss poet and translator (b. 1868)
1935 – Johan Halvorsen, Norwegian violinist, composer, and conductor (b. 1864)
  1935   – Charles Richet, French physiologist and academic, Nobel Prize laureate (b. 1850)
1938 – Tamanishiki San'emon, Japanese sumo wrestler, the 32nd Yokozuna (b. 1903)
1942 – Juhan Kukk, Estonian politician, 3rd Head of State of Estonia (b. 1885)
  1942   – Fritz Löhner-Beda, Jewish Austrian librettist, lyricist and writer (b. 1883)
1944 – Roger Bresnahan, American baseball player and manager (b. 1879)
1945 – Thomas Hunt Morgan, American geneticist and biologist, Nobel Prize laureate (b. 1866)
  1945   – Richárd Weisz, Hungarian Olympic champion wrestler (b. 1879) 
1948 – Frank Benford, American physicist and engineer (b. 1883)
1950 – Jesse L. Brown, 1st African-American Naval aviator (b. 1926)
1954 – George Shepherd, 1st Baron Shepherd (b. 1881)
1955 – József Galamb, Hungarian-American engineer (b. 1881)
1963 – Constance Davey, Australian psychologist (b. 1882)
1967 – Bert Lahr, American actor (b. 1895)
1969 – Fred Hampton, American Black Panthers activist (b. 1948)
1971 – Shunryū Suzuki, Japanese-American monk and educator, founded the San Francisco Zen Center (b. 1904)
1975 – Hannah Arendt, German-American historian, theorist, and academic (b. 1906)
1976 – Tommy Bolin, American guitarist and songwriter (b. 1951)
  1976   – Benjamin Britten, English pianist, composer, and conductor (b. 1913)
  1976   – W. F. McCoy, Irish soldier, lawyer, and politician (b. 1886)
1980 – Francisco de Sá Carneiro, Portuguese lawyer and politician, 111th Prime Minister of Portugal (b. 1934)
  1980   – Stanisława Walasiewicz, Polish-American runner (b. 1911)
  1980   – Don Warrington, Canadian football player (b. 1948)
1981 – Jeanne Block, American psychologist (b. 1923)
1984 – Jack Mercer, American animator, screenwriter, voice actor, and singer (b. 1910)
1987 – Arnold Lobel, American author and illustrator (b. 1933)
  1987   – Rouben Mamoulian, Georgian-American director and screenwriter (b. 1897)
1988 – Osman Achmatowicz, Polish chemist and academic (b. 1899)
1992 – Henry Clausen, American lawyer and author (b. 1905)
1993 – Margaret Landon, American missionary and author (b. 1903)
  1993   – Frank Zappa, American singer-songwriter, guitarist, and producer (b. 1940)
1999 – Rose Bird, American academic and judge, 25th Chief Justice of California (b. 1936)
2000 – Henck Arron, Surinamese banker and politician, 1st Prime Minister of the Republic of Suriname (b. 1936)
2003 – Iggy Katona, American race car driver (b. 1916)
2004 – Elena Souliotis, Greek soprano and actress (b. 1943)
2005 – Errol Brathwaite, New Zealand soldier and author (b. 1924)
  2005   – Gregg Hoffman, American film producer (b. 1963)
2006 – K. Ganeshalingam, Sri Lankan accountant and politician, Mayor of Colombo (b. 1938)
  2006   – Ross A. McGinnis, American soldier, Medal of Honor recipient (b. 1987)
2007 – Pimp C, American rapper (b. 1973)
2009 – Liam Clancy, Irish singer, actor, and guitarist (b. 1935)
2010 – King Curtis Iaukea, American wrestler (b. 1937)
2011 – Sonia Pierre, Haitian-Dominican activist (b. 1965) 
  2011   – Sócrates, Brazilian footballer and manager (b. 1954) 
  2011   – Hubert Sumlin, American singer and guitarist (b. 1931)
2012 – Vasily Belov, Russian author, poet, and playwright (b. 1932)
  2012   – Jack Brooks, American colonel, lawyer, and politician (b. 1922)
  2012   – Miguel Calero, Colombian footballer and manager (b. 1971)
  2012   – Anthony Deane-Drummond, English general (b. 1917)
2013 – Joana Raspall i Juanola, Spanish author and poet (b. 1913)
2014 – Claudia Emerson, American poet and academic (b. 1957)
  2014   – V. R. Krishna Iyer, Indian lawyer and judge (b. 1914)
  2014   – Vincent L. McKusick, American lawyer and judge (b. 1921)
  2014   – Jeremy Thorpe, English lawyer and politician (b. 1929)
2015 – Bill Bennett, Canadian lawyer and politician, 27th Premier of British Columbia (b. 1932)
  2015   – Robert Loggia, American actor and director (b. 1930)
  2015   – Yossi Sarid, Israeli journalist and politician, 15th Israeli Minister of Education (b. 1940)
2016 – Patricia Robins, British writer and WAAF officer (b. 1921)
2017 – Shashi Kapoor, Indian actor (b. 1938)
2022 – Bob McGrath, American singer and actor (b. 1932)
  2022   – Patrick Tambay, French race car driver (b. 1949)

Holidays and observances
Christian feast day:
Ada
Anno II
Barbara, and its related observances:
Barbórka, Miners' Day in Poland
Eid il-Burbara, a holiday similar to Halloween in honor of Saint Barbara. (Russia, Israel, Jordan, Lebanon, Palestine, Syria, Turkey)
Bernardo degli Uberti
Clement of Alexandria (Anglicanism, Eastern Catholicism)
Giovanni Calabria
John of Damascus
Maruthas
Nicholas Ferrar (Anglicanism)
Osmund
Sigiramnus
December 4 (Eastern Orthodox liturgics)
Navy Day (India)
Thai Environment Day (Thailand)
Tupou I Day (Tonga)

References

External links

 BBC: On This Day
 
 Historical Events on December 4

Days of the year
December